NNS Oji (P-275) is the third and latest iteration of the Seaward Defence Boat class of vessels built for the Nigerian Navy by its engineers at the Naval Dockyard, Victoria Island, Lagos.

The vessel was commissioned by the Nigerian President Muhammadu Buhari. NNS Oji follows (P-275) along with its sister ships was built to further Nigeria's self-reliance in shipbuilding.

During the commissioning ceremony, President Muhammadu Buhari started that ‘‘We should note that we are in a critical period where our country is faced with a serious decline in our revenue and the security challenges we are facing,” Buhari added, urging the personnel to make good use of the platforms as well as maintain professionalism.

‘‘The present realities, therefore, call for prudent resource management, innovativeness, accountability, and careful maintenance. I wish to reiterate that despite these challenges, our administration is very determined to ensure that the Navy is well supported to achieve its statutory responsibilities.

“Let me assure you that the Government will continue to support the ideals of the Nigerian Navy in the performance of its constitutional duties. God bless the Nigerian Navy, God bless the Federal Republic of Nigeria. Onward Together.”

NNS Oji is the latest in a line of indigenous littoral vessels with the first of the SDB class, NNS Andoni (P-100), delivered on 7 June 2012, and 40 metres SDB 2 NNS Karaduwa (P-102) delivered on 15 December 2016.

For patrol duties, the vessel, NNS Oji (P275) is armed with a 30mm remotely operated naval gun, three 12.7 mm machine guns, and an optional 40mm grenade launcher.

It is fitted with a Simrad radar control station, and an RHIB to launch naval boarding parties is carried at the rear of the vessel.

References

Nigerian Navy